Leif Nordgren (born May 18, 1989 in Colorado Springs, Colorado) is an American biathlete.

Living in Minnesota and introduced to biathlon by his elder sister Sonne at age 14, he started competing seriously in the sport at age 17. He placed top ten in all events in the 2008 Junior World Championships, obtaining a bronze medal in 10 km pursuit. He has competed in the World Championships 2011–2019, with the best results in relays (6 in 2011). His best individual result in the World Championship is 17 in mass start in 2011.

Nordgren competed at the 2014 Winter Olympics in Sochi. and the 2018 Winter Olympics in Pyeongchang. He has qualified to represent the United States at the 2022 Winter Olympics.

He is a 2007 graduate of Forest Lake Area High School. He is a specialist in the Vermont Army National Guard.

Biathlon results
All results are sourced from the International Biathlon Union.

Olympic Games
0 medals

*The mixed relay was added as an event in 2014.

World Championships
0 medals

*During Olympic seasons competitions are only held for those events not included in the Olympic program.
**The mixed relay was added as an event in 2005.

References

External links

1989 births
Living people
American male biathletes
American military Olympians
Olympic biathletes of the United States
Biathletes at the 2014 Winter Olympics
Biathletes at the 2018 Winter Olympics
Biathletes at the 2022 Winter Olympics
Sportspeople from Minnesota
American people of Norwegian descent
United States Army soldiers
Vermont National Guard personnel
21st-century American people